Rogelio Ruiz (born 20 August 1950) is a Mexican former footballer. He competed in the men's tournament at the 1972 Summer Olympics.

References

External links
 

1950 births
Living people
Mexico international footballers
Olympic footballers of Mexico
Footballers at the 1972 Summer Olympics
Sportspeople from Torreón
Footballers from Coahuila
Mexican footballers
Association football goalkeepers
Liga MX players